
Gmina Nowe Warpno is an urban-rural gmina (administrative district) in Police County, West Pomeranian Voivodeship, in north-western Poland, on the German border.

Villages
Apart from the town of Nowe Warpno, Gmina Nowe Warpno contains the villages and settlements of Brzózki, Maszkowo, Mszczuje, Myślibórz Mały, Myślibórz Wielki, Popielewo, Trzebieradz and Warnołęka.

Tourism
The most interesting places are Szczecin Lagoon, Puszcza Wkrzańska Forest and an old architecture in Nowe Warpno and villages in the area, e.g. Assumption of Mary Church in Nowe Warpno (15th century), the town hall in Nowe Warpno built in 1697 and Black Madonna of Częstochowa Church in Warnołęka (18th century).

Neighbouring gminas
Gmina Nowe Warpno is bordered by the city of Świnoujście and by the gminas of Police and Stepnica. It also borders Germany.

Gallery

References
Polish official population figures 2006

Nowe Warpno
Police County